The Davisville Historic District is a historic district on Davisville Road in Davisville, Rhode Island, a village in North Kingstown.  It encompasses the site of an early 19th-century mill, and several associated buildings, including five houses dating to the 18th or 19th century and a cemetery.  It is located on either side of Davisville Road, between the Hunt River and Olde Mill Lane.

The district was listed on the National Register of Historic Places in 1985.

See also

National Register of Historic Places listings in Washington County, Rhode Island

References

North Kingstown, Rhode Island
Historic districts in Washington County, Rhode Island
Historic districts on the National Register of Historic Places in Rhode Island